Miami River may refer to:

In Ohio
Great Miami River, a tributary of the Ohio River
Little Miami River, a tributary of the Ohio River
Maumee River, referred to in the Ohio Constitution as the Miami River of the Lake

Elsewhere
 St. Joseph River (Lake Michigan), a river; formerly Rivière des Miamis (River of the Miamis)
Miami River (Florida), a tributary of Biscayne Bay
Miami River (New York), a tributary of Lewey Lake
Miami River (Oregon), a tributary of Tillamook Bay

See also 
 Maumee River, Indiana and Ohio
 Miami (disambiguation)